Kurt Allerman (born 1955) is a former American Football linebacker who played nine seasons in the National Football League.

A native of Kinnelon, New Jersey, Allerman played college football at Penn State, where he played inside / outside linebacker and was chosen as an All-American in 1976.

References

American football linebackers
St. Louis Cardinals (football) players
Green Bay Packers players
Penn State Nittany Lions football players
People from Glen Ridge, New Jersey
People from Kinnelon, New Jersey
1955 births
Living people
Detroit Lions players